Markovski or Markovsky (Cyrillic: Марковски or Марковский) is a Slavic masculine surname, its feminine counterpart is Markovska or Markovskaya. The surname may refer to:
 Aleksey Markovsky (born 1957), Russian swimmer 
Aleksandar Markovski (born 1975), Serbian football player 
Gjorgi Markovski (born 1986), Macedonian alpine skier 
Gorjan Markovski (born 1992), Macedonian basketball player 
Ivan Markovski (born 1935), Bulgarian ice hockey player
John Markovski (born 1970), Australian soccer coach and former player of Macedonian descent
Jovan Markovski (born 1988), Macedonian basketball small forward
 Leopoldo Roberto Markovsky (born 1983), Brazilian footballer
Ljupčo Markovski (born 1967), Macedonian football central defender
Marko Markovski (born 1986), Serbian footballer
Mile Markovski (1939–1975), Bulgarian and Macedonian writer
Veni Markovski (born 1968), Bulgarian Internet pioneer
Venko Markovski (1915–1988), Bulgarian writer, poet, and politician of Macedonian descent
Zare Markovski (born 1960), Macedonian basketball player and coach

See also
 Markoski
 Markov
 Marković
 Markovits
 Markowski

Macedonian-language surnames
Bulgarian-language surnames
Patronymic surnames